Kataik Dam is a dam in Paung Township, Thaton District, Mon State, Burma. It was completed in 2007 and became the 198th dam in Burma and the 10th in Mon State, opening on May 1. It is operated by the Irrigation Department of the Burmese Ministry of Agriculture and Irrigation nand is intended to  benefit  of farmlands and facilitate regional socio-economic development as part of an overall coordinated state development  in Mon State. Agricultural productivity is important to the economy of the region,  not only for trade but for ensuring an adequate food supply.

References

Dams in Myanmar
Buildings and structures in Mon State
Dams completed in 2007